Several fictional groups of mutants have used the name Hellions in American comic books published by Marvel Comics. The Hellions have always been portrayed as rivals of various teams of younger mutant heroes in the X-Men franchise, initially as actual villains and later on a team that was more of a school rival than actual enemies of the X-Men.

The first and most notable incarnation of the Hellions were students of Emma Frost and the Hellfire Club's Massachusetts Academy, and were rivals of the New Mutants. The original Hellions first appeared in New Mutants #16 (June 1984), created by writer Chris Claremont and artist Sal Buscema. This version of the Hellions ended after an attack by Trevor Fitzroy and a squadron of Sentinels that killed several Hellions.

Two later groups known as the Hellions or New Hellions both fought against various X groups such as Generation X and X-Force.

In New X-Men: Academy X a new group of Hellions were introduced, this time they were a part of the Xavier Institute for Higher Learning, the Hellions was one of several factions that the students were divided into including the New Mutants, with whom they had a rivalry. After the majority of mutants lost their powers in the Decimation storyline the Hellions were combined into one squad as the number of mutants was greatly reduced.

Hellions (Massachusetts Academy)

The original group of Hellions were apprentices of the Hellfire Club and students of its White Queen Emma Frost. While attending classes at Frost's Massachusetts Academy, these young mutants secretly trained in the use of their powers in an underground complex beneath the school. They were longtime rivals of the Professor Charles Xavier's students, the New Mutants, and once held their own against the X-Men. The original Hellions were:

 Catseye (Sharon Smith), an American girl who could transform her body into a purple feline or semi-feline state and shift her size between that of a house cat or a panther. This granted her razor sharp claws, enhanced senses and physical attributes, plus a prehensile tail. Catseye originally believed she was a cat with the ability to transform into a human.
 Empath (Manuel de la Rocha); a handsome, yet cruel and arrogant young Spanish man with the ability to sense and manipulate the emotions of others. 
 Jetstream (Haroum ibn Sallah al-Rashid), from Morocco, could generate bio-thermal energy that allowed him to propel himself through the air and move at superhuman speeds. Aided in flight by bionically implanted jets that focus his energies and a cybernetic guidance system.
 Roulette (Jennifer Stavros), an American girl from Atlantic City who could psionically influence probabilities, usually through colored disks of energy she generated and threw towards her targets: white disks for good luck, black disks for bad.
 Tarot (Mari-Ange Colbert), a good-natured girl from Lyons, France who had the ability to see past and future events of other people due to a combination of her mutant powers and her tarot cards. She could also materialize and animate tangible images of the 2-D avatars/images on her tarot cards. Once materialized they are completely under her mental control and could do her bidding including aiding her in battle and flight. 
 Thunderbird (James Proudstar), the younger brother of deceased X-Man John Proudstar (the original Thunderbird), who possessed similar superhuman physical attributes, senses, and healing ability. He reformed and has served on the several X-Men teams under the codename, Warpath, and is currently a member of the X-Men.

White Queen Emma Frost had another potential Hellion in Firestar (Angelica Jones), but kept the girl from joining the team on field missions while grooming her to be Frost's personal assassin. Firestar eventually learned of Frost's plans and left the Massachusetts Academy.

After suffering a severe trauma at the hands of the Beyonder, a number of the New Mutants were transferred to the Massachusetts Academy by Magneto (then headmaster of Xavier's School for Gifted Youngsters), due to their apparent need for psychic therapy from Emma Frost. While at the academy, the transferred New Mutants — Cannonball, Wolfsbane, Karma, Cypher, Magik, and Magma — were inducted into the Hellions. They soon returned to Xavier's School after their recovery and the revelation that the White Queen had employed Empath to coerce Magneto into allowing the transfer. After an alliance between the X-Men and the Hellfire Club and Magneto's ascension to the Inner Circle as its White King, relations between the Hellions and New Mutants improved.

Magma, realizing she held feelings for Empath, eventually returned to the Hellions and the Massachusetts Academy; the two would later leave the team to travel to her home in Nova Roma. James Proudstar also left the Hellions, reemerging with Cable and the remnants of the New Mutants in X-Force.

Superstrong and durable Beef (Buford Wilson) and bioelectricity-projecting Bevatron (Fabian Marechal-Julbin) were later additions to the group. They were present when the Hellions unsuccessfully challenged the New Warriors over the allegiance of their former member, Firestar.

The original Hellions however came to an end when Trevor Fitzroy and a squadron of Sentinels attacked a Hellfire Club function; Jetstream and Beef were killed immediately, while Tarot, the rest of the Hellions and many guests erroneously believed to be unnamed Hellions were captured and drained of their life energies by Fitzroy. Emma Frost's guilt over her students' deaths led to her eventual reform.
These Hellions were some of the many deceased mutants resurrected via the Transmode Virus by Selene and Eli Bard during the "Necrosha" storyline running through New Mutants, X-Force and X-Men: Legacy. They survived and are once again acting as a team.

With the establishing of the new sovereign mutant nation of Krakoa, the original Hellions and Bevatron, now free of the Transmode Virus, have all taken up residence there.

Emplate's Hellions
The next group of Hellions was organized by the parasitic Emplate to attack Generation X, the new class of Emma Frost's students. This group appeared twice with slightly different members.

 Bulwark (Oswald Boeglin) - Bulwark could expand his muscle mass. He would reappear alongside Emplate, but was later captured and killed by the revamped Weapon X program. He was only a member during the team's first appearance.
 D.O.A. (George Baker) - D.O.A. is an energy vampire much like Emplate and his skin is invulnerable to most damage.
 Lady Gayle Edgerton - Edgerton was a psychic vampire. She is a former girlfriend of Generation X's Chamber. Emplate took her powers back when she switched sides after she helped capture Chamber. She was only on the team during its first appearance.
 Murmur (Allan Rennie) - Murmur could open teleportation portals within his line of sight. Depowered.
 Nocturne (Bridget Warner) - Nocturne controls an ebon energy. She was part of Emplate's second team.
 Vincente (Vincente Cimetta) - Vincente can change his body from solid to liquid or gas. He can make his gas state poisonous to inhale. An alternate version had previously appeared as a member of the Age of Apocalypse's Generation Next.
 Wrap (Nick Bisley) - Wrap possesses super strength. He is an energy being whose bandages hold him together. He was part of Emplate's second team.

Of note is the fact that Emplate never called his group the "Hellions". This name was only attached in Marvel Comics' advertising.

The New Hellions
A group of self-proclaimed "New Hellions" emerged to fight X-Force, whose members included some from the team's past:

 Bedlam (Jesse Aaronson) - Bedlam can produce a bioelectrical field that disrupts electrical systems. He briefly defected from X-Force to join his brother and the New Hellions.
 Feral (Maria Callasantos) - Feral possesses superhuman speed, agility, reflexes and senses. She has a limited healing factor, claws and a tail. A former member of X-Force, she was killed by Sabretooth after being depowered. After her death she was given the chance to return as ghost under the service of deities and demons. 
  King Bedlam  (Christopher Aaronson) - evil Jesse Aaronson's older brother, with whom he shares the same kid of disruption powers.  
 Magma (Amara Juliana Olvians Aquilla) - Magma could control fire, heat, magma and tectonic plates. She needs to be in her magma form to use these abilities to their full potential. She is a former New Mutant.
 Paradigm - Paradigm was a mutant infused with techno-organic material extracted from the alien Phalanx. His head  is shown being used to infiltrate Beast's files. Cyclops destroys it.
 Switch (Devon Alomar) - Switch is able to switch minds with an individual to possess their body.
 Tarot (Mari-Ange Colbert) - Tarot is an original Hellion inexplicably resurrected, Tarot's life was somehow joined to King Bedlam. When he was depowered, she died again.

Xavier Institute

After the reopening of the Xavier Institute for Higher Learning various training squads are formed. One such group of students, under the tutelage of headmistress Emma Frost, is dubbed "the Hellions". They have an intense rivalry with another such group, the New Mutants, echoing the relationship between the two original groups of the same names.  Membership consists of:

 Dust (Sooraya Qadir) - can convert her body into a malleable cloud of dust that she can manipulate at will and which grants immunity to magic. She was one of the 27 students at the Xavier Institute to retain her powers after M-Day. Dust is a member of the X-Men and a student at the Jean Grey School for Higher Learning. 
 Hellion (Julian Keller) - the leader of the Hellions; possesses high-level telekinesis. He was one of the 27 students at the Xavier Institute to retain his powers after M-Day. He is currently a student at the Jean Grey School for Higher Learning and a member of the X-Men. 
 Icarus (Joshua Guthrie) - has the power of flight, a limited healing factor, and the ability to mimic any sound he hears. He is shot by William Stryker.
 Mercury (Cessily Kincaid) - body is composed of non-toxic inorganic liquid mercury that she can mold into any shape at will, stick to walls with and become protected from magical attacks. She is one of the 27 students at the Xavier Institute to retain her powers after M-Day. She is currently a student at the Jean Grey School for Higher Learning and a member of the X-Men.
 Rockslide (Santo Vaccarro) - forms animated rock bodies for himself that grants him superhuman strength, durability and endurance. In addition, Rockslide is able to violently detonate his entire body at will and then reform on command. Santo is one of the 27 students at the Xavier Institute to retain his powers after M-Day. He is currently a student at the Jean Grey School for Higher Learning and a member of the X-Men.
 Specter (Dallas Gibson) - could merge with his shadow to increase his strength, speed and durability. In this shadow form, he could see in darkness and was immune to darkness-based attacks. Shortly after the squads are formed, he was transferred twice, ending up on the Corsairs squad. He was depowered during M-Day and living with his grandparents.
 Tag (Brian Cruz) - could place a psionic imprint upon himself or others that attracted or repelled other people. He was depowered during M-Day. Brian dies on the bus that is bombed by William Stryker. 
 Wither (Kevin Ford) - decays organic matter by his "death touch". He is one of the 27 students at the Xavier Institute to retain his powers after M-Day. After this, he comes under the influence of Selene and is killed by Elixir.

After M-Day, the cataclysmic event that decimated the world's mutant population, only 27 of the 182 students enrolled at the Xavier Institute retain their powers, and the remaining students are folded into a single training squad, the New X-Men. For the Hellions, only Tag and Specter were depowered.

All-New Hellions (Hellfire Academy)

After the events of Avengers vs. X-Men, the new Black King of the Hellfire Club, Kade Kilgore, creates the Hellfire Academy, a school for training mutants to be villains. Kilgore recruits for his school some former students of the X-Men and creates a new team of Hellions.

Dawn of X Hellions

A Hellions title was launched March 2020 as part of Dawn of X. Written by Zeb Wells, and drawn by Stephen Segovia, the initial cast comprised Empath, Havok, Mister Sinister, Nanny, Orphan-Maker, Psylocke, Scalphunter, and Wild Child.

Cast

Prints

Collected Editions

Trade Paperback

Hardcover

Other versions

Age of Apocalypse
The original Hellions appear briefly in an alternate universe depicted in the Age of Apocalypse storyline as former agents of Apocalypse. After his death, they become renegades and are hunted down and captured by the X-Men on the United States government's behalf.

House of M
In an alternate universe depicted in the House of M storyline, the Hellions exist as S.H.I.E.L.D.'s "Hellion Squad", led by Danielle Moonstar and consisting of Hellion, Magik, Quill, Surge, Synch, and Wind Dancer.

See also
Hellfire Club (comics)
Massachusetts Academy (comics)
New Mutants

References

External links
Uncannyxmen.net article on the original Hellions
Uncannyxmen.net article on the New Hellions
Hellions Squad Page at UXN.net

X-Men supporting characters
Marvel Comics superhero teams
Marvel Comics supervillain teams
Fictional organizations